Nima Tapu are the Royal Undertakers for the Tongan royal family. It is their role to prepare the dead king's body for burial. Once the preparation is complete, they are not allowed to use their hands for any other purpose for the next 100 days. In earlier times the nima tapu would be strangled or have their hands cut off after preparing the king's body.

References
 Tongan royal mourning is broken. BBC News, 28 December 2006. Retrieved 19 Feb 2007.

Tongan monarchy
Death customs